The Grand Mosque is a mosque in Dubai, Emirate of Dubai, United Arab Emirates. It is located between the textile souk and the Dubai Museum close to a small stream in the Bur Dubai area. Originally built in 1900, demolished and built again in 1960, it then underwent a further rebuilding in 1998 (the present one). It now holds up to 1,200 worshippers. Non-Muslims are permitted to enter the Mosque daily from Sunday to Thursday from 9 AM to 11:30 AM for free tours. The mosque is the hub of Dubai's religious and cultural life.

History
The mosque was originally a school devoted to study of the Qur'an, known as a kuttab, which welcomed its first students in the year 1900 to learn the Qur'an by rote. This building was replaced by a new mosque on the same site in 1960, which in turn was itself rebuilt in 1998, closer in style to the original of 1900. This mosque is one of the largest in Dubai and is dominant edifice in the old city.

Architecture
The tallest feature of the mosque is the  minaret, the tallest in Dubai, which resembles a lighthouse. The sandy-grey walls are generally unadorned, but there is a large Quranic inscription inlaid above the five columns of the entrance facade, which sit at the top of a short flight of six steps. The 45 small and nine larger domes with the tall minaret cover the roof of the Grand Mosque. The wooden windows are fitted with hand-made stained glass and blend well with the old town of Bur Dubai, and its minaret is designed in Anatolian architectural style. Visitors to the mosque are advised to dress conservatively. The mosque has a capacity of up to 1,200 worshippers.
Nearest metro station is Al Fahidi.

See also
 Jumeirah Mosque
 Islam in the United Arab Emirates

References

Mosques completed in 1998
Mosques in Dubai
Mosques completed in 1900
Mosque buildings with domes
Dubai